Incantation is a 2022 Taiwanese found footage supernatural horror film directed by Kevin Ko, who also co-wrote the screenplay with Chang Che-wei. The film was released in Taiwan on March 18, 2022, and it became the highest-grossing Taiwanese horror film.  It received international distribution from Netflix on July 8, 2022.

Plot 
A woman named Li Ronan narrates the film, imploring the viewer to memorize an insignia and chant an incantation to send blessings and lift a curse on her six-year-old daughter, Dodo. The insignia and incantation are interspersed frequently throughout the film to encourage the viewer to pray along. The events of the film are shown as a found footage in a non-linear manner.

Six years earlier, Ronan, her boyfriend Dom, and Dom's cousin Yuan, broke a religious taboo while documenting a ritual for their online video channel. They went to a remote clan village inhabited by Dom and Yuan's relatives, who practiced an esoteric Yunnan religion worshipping an ancestral deity called Mother-Buddha. The clan asked the three to submit their names with the incantation to the Mother-Buddha. A clan elder told Ronan that after her daughter was born, she must also submit her daughter's name; Ronan was surprised as she had not realized that she was pregnant.

That night, the group spied on the clan performing the ritual, where a young girl seemed to be willingly prepared for a sacrifice. The unconscious girl, whose body was covered in runes, was left in front of a tunnel, which the group were keen to enter but the clan had said was forbidden. Ronan waited with the girl while Dom and Yuan entered the tunnel after destroying its barricades. Yuan later emerged screaming hysterically, while Dom's lifeless body was later seen being carried by the villagers from the tunnel. The footage from within the tunnel has since become damaged and cannot be played. After Dodo was born, Ronan left her at a foster care home and sought psychiatric help.

In the present, Ronan has recovered and is taking Dodo to live with her. Their house soon becomes infested by unexplained activities and Dodo is disturbed by a shadowy presence. Dodo gradually develops a debilitating illness and Ronan's mental health declines. When social workers arrive to take Dodo away, she and Ronan escape with the help of Ming, the sympathetic manager of the foster care home. They bring Dodo to a shrine, where a priest and his wife agree to risk their lives to exorcize Dodo. They forbid her from eating for the next seven days, but when her condition deteriorates and runes appear all over her body, Ronan feeds her. The priest and his wife are violently killed, and Ronan takes Dodo to a hospital.

Meanwhile, Ming goes to Yunnan to conduct more research into the esoteric religion and restores the damaged tunnel footage. As his mental health rapidly declines from watching the undamaged portion of the footage, he decides not to send the tunnel footage to Ronan. However, he later becomes possessed and sends copies of the tunnel footage to Ronan before killing himself by smashing his own head repeatedly on camera. In the footage, it is shown that Dom and Yuan had reached the altar of the Mother-Buddha, whose face was covered with a veil. While trying to remove the veil, Dom got possessed and died after smashing his head. The footage also reveals that Yuan became possessed before being violently killed in the village by unseen forces.

Ronan confesses that she has been lying to the viewer all along. It is revealed that a priest in Yunnan had explained to her that the Mother-Buddha is a malevolent entity, and that if you submit your name with the incantation, it means you agree to carry the curse. Instead of conveying blessings, the incantation actually serves to dilute the curse. When more people chant it, the curse gets spread out and the burden on those bearing it becomes lighter. The Mother-Buddha's face has to be covered because it is the source of the curse. Ronan, now covered in runes, returns and enters the tunnel correcting small mistakes in the labyrinth of caves and takes the viewer to the altar and asks the person watching for their name before revealing the Mother-Buddha's face on camera. She then gets possessed and smashes her own head on the altar. The film ends with footage of Dodo healthy and happy, implying that the burden of her curse has been shared with everyone who watched the film.

Cast 
 Tsai Hsuan-yen as Li Ronan
 Huang Sin-ting as Dodo
 Kao Ying-hsuan as Ming
 Sean Lin as Dom
 RQ (Wen Ching-yu) as Yuan

Production

Background 
The movie is inspired by an incident in Gushan District, Kaohsiung in 2005. A family of six had claimed that they were possessed by various Chinese folk religion deities, and accused each other of being possessed by demons masquerading as deities. They burned each other with incense, hit each other with sticks and spirit tablets, and splashed feces and urine on each other in an attempt to expel the demons. In the end, they singled out the eldest daughter and attacked her until she died of her injuries. The five remaining members of her family were subsequently charged with the offense of "abandoning a helpless person resulting in the person's death". The case was considered one of mass hysteria.

Design 
Kevin Ko explained that the Mother-Buddha, hand gestures, chant, symbols and everything associated with the religion in the film are all fictitious. Much of the budget was spent on the design and production of the props, especially the large statue of the Mother-Buddha.

The image of the Mother-Buddha incorporated elements from Tibetan Buddhism and Hinduism. The multi-armed form of the Mother-Buddha bears striking similarity to wrathful forms of the Hindu goddess Kali or Mahakali. The first two characters of the Mother-Buddha's Chinese name are also the same as those of the Chinese translation of Mahakali's name. Besides, the role of prepubescent girls in the cult of the Mother-Buddha echoes Kumari-worshipping traditions in Nepal. Moreover, the mutilation of children in the cult of the Mother-Buddha, as well as infants being a prominent part of the form of the Mother-Buddha seen in both murals and the statue, reflects the influence of Hārītī imagery in Buddhism.

Release 
Incantation was showcased at the Network of Asian Fantastic Films (NAFF) project market during the 2019 Bucheon International Fantastic Film Festival before entering production and going on to become the highest grossing Taiwanese horror film.  The film was released in Taiwan on March 18, 2022 and also screened at the Far East Film Festival. In June 2022, Netflix announced that it would distribute the film worldwide on July 8, 2022.

Reception

Box office 
As of June 2022, Incantation has grossed , making it the highest grossing 2022 film in Taiwan.  It became the highest grossing Taiwanese horror film of all time.

Critical response
On the review aggregator website Rotten Tomatoes, the film has an approval rating of 75% based on 12 reviews, with an average rating of 6.8/10.

Awards and nominations

References

External links 
 
 Incantation at Rotten Tomatoes

2020s Mandarin-language films
2022 horror films
Taiwanese horror films
Taiwanese-language films
Religious horror films
Folk horror films
Films about cults
Found footage films